Birch Creek is a  tributary of the Umatilla River in eastern Oregon in the United States. It rises at the confluence of East and West Birch creeks south of Pilot Rock, Oregon, at the base of the Blue Mountains and flows north, slightly west of the city of Pendleton.

Birch Creek is one of the rivers that drain Oregon's northwestern corner of the Blue Mountains, flowing alongside industrial waste ponds, and over two minor impoundments before reaching the Umatilla River. Lands in the Birch Creek drainage are used for logging, grazing, dairy farming, and factory farming. Birch Creek is a source of phosphates and the resulting eutrophication of the Umatilla River.

Pendleton photographer Walter S. Bowman is believed to have been born by Birch Creek.

See also 
List of rivers of Oregon

References

External links
Umatilla Basin Watershed Council

Rivers of Oregon
Rivers of Umatilla County, Oregon